Matt Starr is an American visual artist, poet, conceptual comedian, and experimental filmmaker known for his provocative viral works.

Early life
Starr obtained his BFA in studio art and a minor in Swahili from the University of Indiana.

Art career
In 2015 Starr created and marketed a line of clothing called "Babycore" inspired by outfits he wore during his early childhood. This trend quickly went viral and inspired Jeremy Scott's Fall/Winter 2015 ready to wear collection and Miley Cyrus's BB Talk (2015) music video.

In 2016 Starr enacted and documented the performance piece "Amazon Boy," which was included in the piece of "Art on Amazon" in the March 2020 issue of Art in America.

In 2017 to celebrate the fortieth birthday of the film classic Starr along with theater director and his artistic partner Ellie Sachs did a truncated remake of Woody Allen's "Annie Hall' with a cast of octogenarians from the Lennox Hill Neighborhood House. The idea for the project arose from Starr's relationship with his grandmother in whom he noticed a measurable cognitive  decline due to alzheimer's. Allen himself approved of the project and even suggested other films to be remade. The effort was funded with a Kickstarter campaign. In Starr and Sachs' version of the film Alvy Singer is played by the then 94 year old Harry Miller a designer for TV and stage who won two Emmy's during his career for his work on the CBS soap opera Guiding Light.

In April of 2018 Starr and Ellie Sachs created the instillation "The Museum of Banned Objects", in the gallery at Manhattan's Ace Hotel, sponsored by Planned Parenthood, in a commentary on access to birth control.

In 2020, during the early months of the COVID-19 pandemic, Starr and Sachs founded the Long Distance Movie Club, "a virtual movie-watching group that meets every two weeks in an effort to not only engage seniors in a sense of community but also to help them find some escapism in the midst of self-isolation."

References

American video artists
American performance artists
Living people
Year of birth missing (living people)